Electronic News was a publication that covered the electronics industry, from semiconductor equipment and materials to military/aerospace electronics to supercomputers. It was originally a weekly trade newspaper, which covered all aspects of the electronics industry, including semiconductors, computers, software, communications, space and even television electronics.

History and profile
Fairchild Publications started the newspaper in 1957, as a complement to its other trade newspapers, including Women's Wear Daily, Home Furnishing Daily, Supermarket News, among others. At its peak in 1984, Electronic News took in $25 million in revenue with margins above 50%. The following year, the newspaper began losing advertising and influence to rival Electronic Engineering Times, beginning a decline that eventually led to the newspaper's demise.

In 1971, journalist Don Hoefler published a series of articles entitled "Silicon Valley, USA" in Electronic News. This is thought to be the first published use of the phrase Silicon Valley to describe the area of the southern part of the San Francisco Bay Area in northern California, United States, an area known for its concentration of companies making semiconductors, among them Intel, LSI Logic, and National Semiconductor.

Also in 1971, Electronic News was where Intel first advertised the Intel 4004 microprocessor, considered to be the first single-chip microprocessor.

A decade later, in 1981, when IBM's top-secret Project Acorn emerged as the IBM Personal Computer - the PC - the first reports were published in Electronic News in the weeks before the introduction, much to IBM's consternation. Also in 1982, Electronic News communications industry reporter Frank Barbetta broke the story on the Bell System Divestiture which resulted in the break-up of American Telephone & Telegraph Company, and published the first interview with Judge Harold H. Greene.

The paper eventually grew to have a staff of three dozen full-time journalists, working out of headquarters staffed by full-time journalists in New York City and bureaus in Boston, Washington, D.C., Miami, Atlanta, Dallas, San Francisco, Los Angeles, Denver, Chicago, Minneapolis and Tokyo. In addition, stringers reported in from more than 100 locations around the world.

In 1987, the paper's corporate parent, Fairchild Publications was acquired by Capital Cities Broadcasting, which went on to acquire the American Broadcasting Company, now a unit of The Walt Disney Company. The publication was transferred from Fairchild to Chilton, then a division of Capital Cities/ABC, as the result of a reorganization. After barely a year as part of Chilton, the paper was sold in 1991 to the publishing house International Data Group. After a year of losses, IDG sold the paper in 1993 to an independent investor group put together by one-time publisher Zachary Dicker. In 1996 the paper was sold to Reed Business Information. Reed Business Information sold the magazine to Canon Communications in February 2010. In October 2010 Cannon Communications was acquired by United Business Media, now UBM LLC.
The final edition of Electronic News to be printed on paper was dated December 2, 2002. It continued online until it was later merged into EDN.

References

External links

News magazines published in the United States
Online magazines published in the United States
Science and technology magazines published in the United States
Defunct magazines published in the United States
Magazines established in 1957
Magazines disestablished in 2002
Online magazines with defunct print editions